The Stade Pierre de Coubertin (French for Pierre de Coubertin Stadium) is an indoor arena that is located in Paris, France. It is the home venue of the Paris Saint-Germain Handball team. Currently, the arena has a seating capacity of 4,200 people for basketball games.

History
Stade Pierre de Coubertin was opened in 1937, for the Universal Exposition, and it was rebuilt after bombing that occurred during the Second World War. The stadium was used as a detention centre during the Paris massacre of 1961. In 1990, the arena underwent a renovation, which included a new façade, expansion of its seating capacity, and the addition of various service areas.

In addition to previously being the home arena of the basketball teams Paris BR, Levallois Sporting Club, and Paris-Levallois, each year the Stade Pierre de Coubertin also hosts various sporting events, such as the fencing Grand Prix: Challenge International de Paris (in January) and the Challenge Monal (in February), the Open Gaz de France women's tennis tournament, and the Internationaux de France de Badminton. The arena has been selected to be the venue for the goalball competitions at the 2024 Summer Paralympics.

References

Badminton venues
Basketball in Paris
Basketball venues in France
Boxing venues in France
Handball venues in France
Indoor arenas in France
Judo venues
Sports venues completed in 1937
Sports venues in Hauts-de-Seine
Tennis venues in France